Saul K. Fenster was the sixth president of New Jersey Institute of Technology (NJIT) from 1978 until 2002.

Education
Fenster got his BS from City College of New York, MS from Columbia University, and PhD in Mechanical Engineering from the University of Michigan.

Career
Before joining NJIT, Fenster served Fairleigh Dickinson University in faculty and administrative capacities, including six years as provost of the Rutherford campus. Dr. Fenster taught a number of mechanical engineering courses at the Teaneck campus and was Head of the M.E. department in the late 1960s.

Honors
He is a Fellow of the American Society of Mechanical Engineers and the American Society for Engineering Education. He is also a member of Tau Beta Pi, the engineering honors society.

References

External links
'New Jersey Institute of Technology : Press Releases - NJIT President Saul K. Fenster Announces His Retirement After Serving 23 Years'

Living people
Year of birth missing (living people)
New Jersey Institute of Technology people
University of Michigan College of Engineering alumni
City College of New York alumni
Columbia University alumni
Fairleigh Dickinson University faculty
Fellows of the American Society of Mechanical Engineers
Fellows of the American Society for Engineering Education